Vindictus is an action massively multiplayer online role-playing game (MMORPG) created by devCAT, an internal studio of Korean free-to-play game publisher Nexon. Vindictus is a prequel to the MMORPG Mabinogi, and is known as Mabinogi Heroes in Asia.

Vindictus takes place in the same setting used in Mabinogi, but is placed chronologically several hundred years prior to the first game, during a period of war and strife. Vindictus follows Nexon's traditional free-to-play model. The game itself is free to download and play and charges no purchase price. The game contains a virtual item shop to purchase in-game items with Nexon's virtual currency called NX (or Karma Koin) to enhance the player's character's appearance and abilities.

Gameplay
In Vindictus, "classes" and "characters" are one and the same. When beginning the game, players will have a choice to play as one of seventeen characters, each of which has different combat skills and abilities. Players are free to alter certain aspects of their character's appearance, but basic abilities and combat styles are set at character creation – although some classes have access to two weapon types with different combat styles. All characters are gender-locked. Though the game was originally intended to have five characters, there are now currently twenty plus.

Reception

Vindictus was nominated for best MMO at E3 2010 that was held at the Los Angeles Convention Center from June 14 to 17. IGN awarded Vindictus Best Free-to-Play MMO Game of 2010.

References

External links

 (North America)
 
 
 (Taiwan)
Official Vindictus Wiki
Korea Game Awards Winner

2010 video games
Active massively multiplayer online games
Massively multiplayer online role-playing games
Free-to-play video games
Hack and slash role-playing games
Nexon games
Source (game engine) games
Video games based on Celtic mythology
Video games developed in South Korea
Video games featuring female protagonists
Windows games
Windows-only games